Hoërskool Jim Fouché is a public Afrikaans medium co-educational high school situated in the suburb of Gardeniapark in Bloemfontein in the Free State province of South Africa. It is one of the top academic schools in the Free State. It was founded in 1959.

The school is a successor to Wilgehof Hoërskool, and was named after Jacobus "Jim" Fouché, who became President of South Africa in 1968.

Sports 

 Athletics
 Badminton
 Chess
 Cricket
 Cycling
 Drum Majorettes
 Duathlon
 Golf
 Gym
 Hockey
 Netball
 Pool
 Rugby
 Swimming
 Table tennis
 Tennis

Subjects 

Arts and Culture
Afrikaans
Business Studies
Computer Application Technology
Economics
Engineering Graphics and Design
English
Geography
Information Technology
Life Orientation
Life Science
Mathematics
Mathematical Literacy
Music
Information Technology
Physical Science
Technology
Tourism

South African Computer Olympiad 
The Computer Olympiad is an annual contest with Programming and Applications sections, based on Grade 11 and Grade 12 work in CAT and IT.

Programming Olympiad

2012 
In 2012 Jan De Wet Linde, a Grade 11 student, came second in the Free-State in the Programming Olympiad.

2013 
In 2013 Jan De Wet Linde, Grade 12, was a runner up in the Programming Olympiad, in the top 20 in the country and first in the Free-State.

2014 
In 2014 Walter Heymans, Grade 11, was second in the Free-State and Josiah Meyer, Grade 12, was third in the Free-State.

2015 
In 2015 Walter Heymans, Grade 12, was first in the Free-State.

2016 
In 2016 Shaun Roselt, Grade 12, was first in the Free-State.

Notable alumni
 Leon Schuster (1968, teacher 1973–75)
 Brendan Peyper (2014) - Singer

Notes

References

External links 
 Official site 
 JF Oester, school newspaper, on Facebook

Schools in the Free State (province)
Afrikaans-language schools